Suzanne M. Levine, DPM, PC, is a clinical podiatrist and a foot surgeon at the NewYork–Presbyterian Hospital, Lenox Hill Hospital and The Center for Specialty Care in New York City, New York, United States. She is best known for her book My Feet Are Killing Me!, and for her contributions to several notable newspapers, magazines and TV shows. Levine practices at her New York City podiatry clinic and medical-spa, Institute Beauté.

Career 
Levine contributes regularly as a foot care expert on NBC's The Today Show and WNBC's Today in New York. She has also featured on The Dr. Oz Show, The Doctors (2008), The Oprah Winfrey Show, Entertainment Tonight, Extra, ABC 20/20, The View, Nightline, and Good Morning America. She is credited for inventing the tootsie technique and has participated in a medical mission in Cambodia where she donated one thousand pair of shoes to a local village.

Publications
In addition to her medical practice, Levine is the author of My Feet Are Killing Me!, 50 Ways To Ease Foot Pain, Your Feet Don't Have To Hurt, The Botox Book, and You Don't Need Plastic Surgery with Everett Lautin. Her books have featured on The Couch of CBS 2 New York in a segment called “Beautiful Feet Solutions.”

References

External links
 Dr. Suzanne Levine official page
 Institute Beauté Web site

Living people
American podiatrists
Physicians from New York City
Columbia University alumni
Year of birth missing (living people)